Marsh Creek is a tributary of Rogers Creek in Luzerne County, Pennsylvania, in the United States. Wild trout naturally reproduce within the creek. At least one bridge crosses the creek and the community of Broadway and several wetlands are in the watershed. The surficial geology in the creek's vicinity consists of Wisconsinan Till, Wisconsinan Ice-Contact Stratified Drift, alluvium, wetlands, and bedrock.

Course

Marsh Creek begins in a pond in Ross Township. It flows south for a few tenths of a mile before turning west-southwest for nearly a mile. The creek then turns south-southwest for a few miles, receiving two unnamed tributaries from the right. It eventually turns south-southwest for a few tenths of a mile, crossing State Route 4019 before reaching its confluence with Rogers Creek.

Hydrology

Geography and geology

This gives it a relatively low width to depth ratio of 6.6. The creek's channel at this location has a low sinuosity of 1.1 and an entrenchment ratio of 16.0.

This gives it a much higher width to depth ratio than the section further upstream: 16.5 to 22.5. Like the upper segment, the channel at this location has a sinuosity of 1.1, but its entrenchment ratio is much lower at 2.0 to 4.3.

The slope of Marsh Creek near Silo Road ranges from 0.0011 to 0.0037.

Upstream of Silo Road, the streambed of Marsh Creek mainly consists of fine sand. The surficial geology along the creek in its lower reaches mainly consists of alluvium. Further away from the creek, there is a glacial or resedimented till known as Wisconsinan Till, as well as a few patches of Wisconsinan Ice-Contact Stratified Drift and bedrock consisting of sandstone and shale. There is Wisconsinan Outwash near the mouth of the creek and two patches of wetland near Broadway. The upper reaches of the watershed are mainly dominated by Wisconsinan Till, with bedrock occurring along the edges of the watershed. There are also a few patches of alluvium and three patches of wetland.

Watershed
The mouth of the creek is in the United States Geological Survey quadrangle of Shickshinny. However, its source is in the quadrangle of Sweet Valley. A large slope separates the northern part of the watershed from the main stem watershed of Huntington Creek.

The creek is also near the small community of Broadway. A road known as Silo Road crosses the creek, separating it into two distinct reaches.

A report by Land Studies described Marsh Creek as being one of the most stable stream reaches in its area. It is similar in terms of geology and land use to Walker Run. Marsh Creek is an E5-type stream upstream of Silo Road and a C4-type stream downstream of that road.

History
Marsh Creek was entered into the Geographic Names Information System on August 2, 1979. Its identifier in the Geographic Names Information System is 1180447.

In 1908, a stone arch bridge over Marsh Creek was proposed. The bridge was to cost $800.00. A prestressed box beam or girders bridge was constructed across Marsh Creek in 1936 and was repaired in 2010.

A casing well was once dug through  through glacial drift on the west bank of Marsh Creek. A school known as the Broadway School was also historically located near the creek.

Biology
Wild trout naturally reproduce in Marsh Creek from its headwaters downstream to its mouth.

See also
Black Ash Creek, the other named tributary of Rogers Creek
List of tributaries of Fishing Creek (North Branch Susquehanna River)

References

Rivers of Luzerne County, Pennsylvania
Tributaries of Fishing Creek (North Branch Susquehanna River)
Rivers of Pennsylvania